
Gmina Czersk is an urban-rural gmina (administrative district) in Chojnice County, Pomeranian Voivodeship, in northern Poland.

The gmina contains part of the protected area called Tuchola Landscape Park.

Villages
Apart from the town of Czersk, Gmina Czersk contains the villages and settlements of: 
 
 Badzianko
 Bagna
 Będźmierowice
 Bielawy
 Błoto
 Brda
 Budziska
 Bukowa Góra
 Cegielnia
 Czerska Struga
 Dąbki
 Duża Klonia
 Duże Wędoły
 Gartki
 Gotelp
 Gutowiec
 Jeziórko
 Kaliska
 Kameron
 Kamionka
 Karolewo
 Kęsza
 Klaskawa
 Kłodnia
 Klonowice
 Konewki
 Konigort
 Konigórtek
 Koślinka
 Kosowa Niwa
 Koszary
 Krzyż
 Kurcze
 Kurkowo
 Kwieki
 Łąg
 Łąg-Kolonia
 Lipki
 Listewka
 Łubna
 Łukowo
 Lutom
 Lutomski Most
 Mała Klonia
 Malachin
 Małe Wędoły
 Młynki
 Modrzejewo
 Mokre
 Mosna
 Nieżurawa
 Nowa Juńcza
 Nowe Prusy
 Nowy Młyn
 Odry
 Olszyny
 Ostrowite
 Ostrowy
 Płecno
 Pod Łąg
 Pod Łubnę
 Polana
 Przyjaźnia
 Pustki
 Rówki
 Rytel
 Rytel-Zarzecze
 Sienica
 Stara Juńcza
 Stare Prusy
 Stodółki
 Struga
 Suszek
 Szałamaje
 Szary Kierz
 Szyszkowiec
 Twarożnica
 Uboga
 Uroża
 Ustronie
 Wądoły-Łąg
 Wandowo
 Wędowo
 Wieck
 Wojtal
 Zapędowo
 Zapora
 Zawada
 Złe Mięso
 Złotowo
 Żukowo

Neighbouring gminas
Gmina Czersk is bordered by the gminas of Brusy, Chojnice, Kaliska, Karsin, Osieczna, Śliwice, Stara Kiszewa and Tuchola.

References
Polish official population figures 2006

Czersk
Chojnice County